The 1975 South African presidential election resulted in the unanimous election of Nicolaas Johannes Diederichs of the National Party by Parliament to the position of State President on February 21, 1975. Diedrichs was sworn in on April 19, 1975 during an official ceremony at the Groote Kerk (large church) of Cape Town.

Bibliography 

Presidential elections in South Africa
Presidential election
South African presidential election